Mahmoud Bayati (22 March 1928 – 2 December 2022) was an Iranian football player and coach.

Early life
Bayati was born on 22 March 1928 in Tehran. He was a member and captain of Tehran Students Team when he was a student. He was also a member of Tehran Youth team.

Playing career
Bayati signed a contract with Taj in 1946 and played for senior squad from 1949. He was one of the best players during this time and was invited to the Iran national team in 1950. He retired from international career in 1959 and a year later, he also retired from club career.

Coaching career
Six years after retirement from his club career, Bayati was named as Taj's head coach in 1966. After good results with the team, he was appointed head coach of the Iran national team in 1967 and led the team in the 1968 AFC Asian Cup in which Iran won the title without any loss or draw. He resigned after the tournaments in protest to the then President of Iran Football Federation and was succeeded by Zdravko Rajkov. He returned to the national team after four years and was re-appointed head coach in 1972 after the resignation of Mohammad Ranjbar. Bayati led the team in the 1972 Summer Olympics with bad results and was unable to be qualified to the 1974 FIFA World Cup. He was sacked as national football team head coach in 1974.

Personal life and death
Bayati died on 2 December 2022, at the age of 94.

Honours

Player
Taj
 Tehran Provincial League: 1955–56, 1957–58, 1959–60; runner-up: 1950–51, 1956–57

Iran
 Asian Games Silver medal: 1951

Manager
Iran
AFC Asian Cup: 1968

References 

1928 births
2022 deaths
Sportspeople from Tehran
Esteghlal F.C. players
Esteghlal F.C. managers
Iranian football managers
AFC Asian Cup-winning managers
Asian Games silver medalists for Iran
Asian Games medalists in football
Footballers at the 1951 Asian Games
Medalists at the 1951 Asian Games
Footballers at the 1958 Asian Games
1968 AFC Asian Cup managers
Association football forwards
Iranian footballers
Iran international footballers